Inhambane is a province of Mozambique located on the coast in the southern part of the country. It has an area of 68,615 km2 and a population of 1,488,676 (2017 census). The provincial capital is also called Inhambane.

The climate is tropical throughout, more humid along the coast and dryer inland. The coast has a number of mangrove swamps.

The town of Inhambane existed in the 10th century, and was the southernmost port used by Arabs for slave trading. The region was visited by Vasco da Gama in 1498, who claimed Inhambane Bay for Portugal.  The Portuguese established a trading post at Inhambane in 1534.

The province is the second largest grower of cashews (after Nampula), and also produces coconut and citrus fruit (inspiring Mozambique's most famous poet Craveirinha to write of "The Tasty Tangerines of Inhambane").  The long coastline supports much fishing.  The Inhambane Bay area is of some interest for tourism, with a number of beaches, and one of the last remaining populations of dugong in Mozambique.

Districts
Imhambane Province is divided into the 12 districts of:
 Funhalouro District
 Govuro District
 Homoine District
 Jangamo District
 Inharrime District
 Inhassoro District 
 Mabote District
 Massinga District
 Morrumbene District
 Panda District
 Vilanculos District
 Zavala District

and the municipalities of:
Inhambane provincial capital
Maxixe largest population, and the province's economic capital

Culture
Inhambane is famous for its music, in particular the timbila (xylophone ensemble) of the Chopi ethnic group.

Geography

The province has two of the Mozambique's national parks: Zinave National Park in the northwest and Bazaruto National Park on the Bazaruto Archipelago in the Indian Ocean, in the northeast of the province, as well as the Pomene National Reserve.

Transportation
The province is served by Inhambane Airport, in Jangamo District.

See also
 Postage stamps and postal history of Inhambane
 Secondary School of Doane

References

External links
  Inhambane Province official site

 
Provinces of Mozambique